The 2011 Texas Longhorns football team (variously "Texas," "UT," the "Longhorns," or the "'Horns") represented the University of Texas at Austin in the 2011 NCAA Division I FBS football season. The Longhorns were led by 14th year head coach Mack Brown and played their home games at Darrell K Royal–Texas Memorial Stadium. They are a member of the Big 12 Conference. They finished the season 8–5, 4–5 in Big 12 play to finish in a tie for sixth place improving on their disastrous 5–7 season from 2010. They were invited to the Holiday Bowl where they defeated California 21–10.

Previous season
After the 2009 Texas Longhorns football team lost to Alabama in the 2010 BCS National Championship Game, Texas entered the 2010 NCAA Division I FBS football season ranked fifth in the AP Poll and fourth in the Coaches Poll. Texas won its first three games of the season, maintaining a top 10 status. However, the Longhorns were upset by UCLA, followed by a loss to Oklahoma. This caused Texas to be excluded from both Top 25 polls for the first time since 1998.

2011 NFL Draft

2011 NFL Draft Class

Other signed seniors
Eddie Jones (Linebacker) – New York Jets

John Gold (Punter) – Seattle Seahawks

John Chiles (Wide Receiver) – Jacksonville Sharks

Roster

Recruiting
During the 2011 recruiting period, Texas recruited 18 players, including nine from the ESPN 150. As a result, Texas' recruiting class was ranked first by ESPN and third by both Rivals and Scout.

Schedule

Game summaries

Rice

Sources: 
    
    
    
    
    
    
    
    
    

Texas was favored by 24 points.

The Longhorns opened up the 2011 season against the Rice Owls of Conference USA.  In the previous meeting, which was also the first game that 2010 Texas Longhorns football team played against, Texas won 34–17. Garrett Gilbert was the starting quarterback after he was selected over Case McCoy, David Ash, and Connor Wood.  Rice was able to hold the Longhorns to a three-and-out and attain a field goal to give Rice a 3–0 lead. However, Texas was able to respond with another field goal drive which was highlighted by a 56-yard pass from Gilbert to Mike Davis that would turn out to be the longest pass for the game, tying it at 3–3 at the end of the first quarter. In the second quarter, Rice's Xavier Webb fumbled a punt that was recovered by the Texas team deep inside the Owls' side of the field, setting up the first touchdown of the game and putting Texas at a 10–3 lead. Each team made an additional field goal in the remaining second quarter to put the score at 13–6 with Texas leading.

To start the second half, the Owls were able to narrow the Longhorns' lead to 13–9 after driving 46 yards to make a field goal, but on the ensuing drive Texas was able to increase the lead once again with a touchdown highlighted by a 36-yard pass by John Harris to Jaxon Shipley. This marked the first time that a non-quarterback player made a touchdown pass in school history since 1998 Heisman Trophy winner Ricky Williams. In the fourth quarter, Texas held Rice scoreless while scoring two touchdowns, both of which by running back Foswhitt Whittaker. Texas would hold off Rice for the rest of the game to win 34–9 victory, the seventy-first against Rice overall.

BYU

Sources: 

Texas was favored by 8 points.

Texas remained at home to face BYU. Prior to the game, the two teams had only met twice, in 1988 and 1987. In both games, BYU won with scores of 47–6 and 22–17, respectively. In the first quarter, BYU held Texas scoreless with two punts, answering with two field goals. Garrett Gilbert, the starting quarterback, was replaced by backups Case McCoy and David Ash in the first quarter after throwing two interceptions. To answer Gilbert's second interception, the Cougars were able to drive 97 yards to score the only touchdown of the first half. After the touchdown, BYU lead Texas 13–0. In the second quarter, BYU quarterback Jake Heaps was intercepted by Texas cornerback Adrian Phillips.  This set up a Texas field goal that would be Texas' first score of the game with 1:44 left in the half, cutting the BYU lead to 10 points. The Cougars would keep possession for the remaining second quarter to keep the score at 13–3 at halftime, with BYU still leading. But against all odds, the Texas Longhorns stunned the BYU Cougars by means of a last minute touchdown and earning the victory as a result.

UCLA

Sources: 
    
    
    
    
    
    
    
    
    
    
    

Texas was favored by 4 points.

The Longhorns played UCLA  for their first away game on September 17. In  the previous 3 matches, UCLA won in large blowouts, most notably  in 1997 when they won 66–3 in what became known as 'Rout 66.' Case McCoy and David Ash were selected as  quarterback co-starters after Garrett Gilbert was taken out of the game  against BYU. Texas started quickly into the game when UCLA quarterback Kevin Prince threw an  interception. On the ensuing Longhorn drive, Case McCoy threw a 45-yard pass to D.J. Grant, giving Texas a 7–0 lead. Kevin Prince would throw 2 additional interceptions, both of which Texas scored upon, before taken out of the game.

Iowa State

Sources: 
    
    
    
    
    
    
    
    
    

Texas was favored by 9 points.

Oklahoma

Sources: 

Oklahoma was favored by 11.5 points.

Oklahoma State

Sources:

Oklahoma State was favored by 8 points.

Kansas

Sources:

Texas was favored by 28.5 points.

Texas Tech

Sources:
    
    
    
    
    
    
    
    
    
    
    
    

Texas was favored by 14 points.

Missouri

Sources:

Texas was favored by 1.5 points.

Kansas State

Sources:

Texas was favored by 7.5 points.

Texas A&M

Sources:
    
    
    
    
    
    
    
    
    
    
    

Texas A&M was favored by 8 points.

Baylor

Sources: 

Baylor was favored by 3 points.

Holiday Bowl – California

Sources: ESPN
    
    
    
    
    

Texas was favored by 3 points. Most valuable players were David Ash (QB) and Keenan Robinson (LB).

Rankings

The Texas Longhorns began the season unranked for the first time since 1998 in the AP Poll, although it was ranked twenty-fourth in the Coaches Poll. After wins against Rice and BYU, Texas would slowly increase in the rankings before jumping four spots in the AP Poll and three in the Coaches Poll after winning against UCLA. After the bye week Texas once again jumped another 2 spots in the AP Poll and one in the Coaches Poll. 
In the final BCS rankings, Texas was twenty-fourth. In both the Associated Press' final rankings and USA Today's final rankings, Texas was unranked.

Notes

References

Texas
Texas Longhorns football seasons
Holiday Bowl champion seasons
Texas Longhorns football